Groot Marico is a hamlet in the North West Province of South Africa. The economy relies heavily on agriculture, mining and tourism. Groot Marico is named after the Marico River.

Description
The topography comprises dry bushveld with a climate that is ideal for cattle, maize, citrus fruit and tobacco. Open pit quarries in the area extract marble, slate and andalusite, with prospects of large-scale nickel mining on the banks of the Groot Marico river as well as the majority of the farms surrounding the hamlet having sparked a successful regional petition against such development. In 2016 a new diamond prospecting application was initiated, bringing a new round of local community objections and petitioning.

The town was formed by the Voortrekkers in the 1850s and was only proclaimed in 1948.

The word "Marico" was made famous in South Africa by Herman Charles Bosman's writings of this area and later re-enactments of these tales by actor Patrick Mynhardt. Bosman described the area thus: 

At least part of Bosman's musings may have been inspired by sips of the mampoer for which Groot Marico is infamous.

In 2010, the farms surrounding Groot Marico were among the last in South Africa to still be  connected through party lines to a manual telephone exchange, which require callers to ask an operator to connect them to other telephone lines by pushing jacks into slots.

Groot Marico is the smallest town in South Africa that host an annual arts festival as well as a mountain bike race.

References

Populated places in the Ramotshere Moiloa Local Municipality
Populated places founded by Afrikaners